Shaker lemon pie, also known as Ohio lemon pie, is a fruit pie typical of the Midwestern United States.

Origin 

The pie was first made in the religious communities of Shakers. Their success at fruit-growing led to the development of what has been called "a veritable calendar of pies"  In the Midwestern climate, however, lemons could not be grown, and cookbook author Caroline Piercy writes that "according to old accounts, lemons were the first food ever purchased by North Union."  Two versions of the lemon pie developed, one resembling a standard lemon meringue pie, the other, more frugal version using the whole lemon.

Preparation 

The original pie filling recipe calls for ordinary lemons, white sugar, and eggs. The entire lemon including peel is sliced paper thin, gently mixed with sugar, and left to macerate for at least four hours and up to a full day, "the longer the better".  During this time the mixture should be stirred every few hours, and any seeds picked out.  The sugar will dissolve and the peel will soften. The beaten eggs are then mixed in, the filling added to the crust, either a lattice or full top crust added, and the pie baked.  The resulting filling is a cross between marmalade and lemon curd.  The pie is best served warm.

Modern variations may substitute Meyer lemons or brown sugar and add other flavorings such as ginger or blackberries.

See also 

 List of lemon dishes and beverages

References 

American pies
Cuisine of the Midwestern United States
Fruit pies
Lemon dishes